Boduszewo  is a village in the administrative district of Gmina Murowana Goślina, within Poznań County, Greater Poland Voivodeship, in west-central Poland. It is close to the edge of the forests of the Puszcza Zielonka Landscape Park.

The village has a population of 240. It has a 19th-century palace, in whose grounds an annual local fair (Targ Wiejski) takes place. Boduszewo also has its own volunteer fire brigade.

References

Boduszewo